MGN can refer to:

Marine Guidance Notes, by UK Maritime and Coastguard Agency
National Rail station code for Marston Green railway station, UK
Mirror Group Newspapers, UK, now part of Trinity Mirror
Medial geniculate nucleus, a subnucleus of the thalamus in the brain
Membranous glomerulonephritis, a kidney disease
Former UK Midland and Great Northern Joint Railway
Mouettes Genevoises Navigation, public transportation by boat in Geneva, Switzerland